The Thai FA Cup 2012 is the 19th season of Thailand knockout football competition. The tournament is organized by the Football Association of Thailand.

The cup winner were guaranteed a place in the 2013 AFC Champions League.

Calendar

Qualifying round
The Qualifying Round was held on April 25–26, 2012.  Thonburi University and Paknampo NSRU FC had byes.

|-
|colspan="3" style="background-color:#99CCCC"|25 April 2012

|-
|colspan="3" style="background-color:#99CCCC"|26 April 2012

 1 Ranong won because Samut Prakan Customs United withdrew

First round
The first round matches were held on May 2, 2012.

|-
|colspan="3" style="background-color:#99CCCC"|2 May 2012

Second round
The draw for the second round was held on 3 May 2012. Matches were held on May 9 and 16,  2012.

|-
|colspan="3" style="background-color:#99CCCC"|9 May 2012

|-
|colspan="3" style="background-color:#99CCCC"|16 May 2012

 1 Trat won because F.C. Phuket withdrew

Third round
The draw for the third round was held on 29 May 2012. Matches were held on 1 and 15 August 2012.

|-
|colspan="3" style="background-color:#99CCCC"|1 August 2012

|-
|colspan="3" style="background-color:#99CCCC"|15 August 2012

 1 Army United won because Trat players that break the rules

Fourth round
The draw for the third round was held on 17 August 2012. Matches were held on 29 August 2012.

|-
|colspan="3" style="background-color:#99CCCC"|29 August 2012

Quarter-finals

|-
|colspan="3" style="background-color:#99CCCC"| 3 October 2012

Semi-finals

|-
|colspan="3" style="background-color:#99CCCC"|24,25 October 2012

Final

|-
|colspan="3" style="background-color:#99CCCC"|4 November 2012

References

Thai FA Cup seasons
1